There are several positions within the United Nations that have the title Vice President:

 Vice President of the United Nations General Assembly
 Vice President of the United Nations Security Council
 Vice President of the United Nations Economic and Social Council

See also
 World government in fiction#Vice President of Earth